Oregon Route 334 (OR 334) is an Oregon state highway running from OR 37 near Myrick to OR 11 near Athena. OR 334 is known as the Athena-Holdman Highway No. 334 (see Oregon highways and routes).

OR 334 was established in 2003 as part of Oregon's project to assign route numbers to highways that previously were not assigned, and, as of October 2020, was unsigned.

Route description 

OR 334 begins at an intersection with OR 37 approximately ten miles north of Pendleton and heads east through Myrick. After OR 335 turns north toward Helix, OR 334 then continues east through Athena, ending at an intersection with OR 11 approximately one mile east of Athena.

History 

OR 334 was assigned to the Athena-Holdman Highway in 2003.

Major intersections

References 

334
Transportation in Umatilla County, Oregon